Christiaan Loedolff Fismer (born 30 September 1956) was the Deputy Minister of General Affairs and Deputy Minister of Justice under South African President Nelson Mandela, from 1994/5 to 1999.

See also

African Commission on Human and Peoples' Rights
Constitution of South Africa
History of the African National Congress
Politics in South Africa
Provincial governments of South Africa

References

Justice ministers of South Africa
Nelson Mandela
Living people
1956 births